Dodge is an unincorporated community and census-designated place (CDP) in Delaware County, Oklahoma, United States. The population was 115 at the 2010 census, up from the figure of 96 recorded in 2000.

The Dodge Post Office existed from November 20, 1901, until August 15, 1941. Dodge was established on Cowskin Prairie along the St. Louis-San Francisco Railway in District 6 of the old Indian Territory.

Geography
Dodge is located in northeastern Delaware County at  (36.578738, -94.652037).

Demographics

As of the census of 2000, there were 96 people, 32 households, and 27 families residing in the CDP. The population density was 14.6 people per square mile (5.6/km2). There were 34 housing units at an average density of 5.2/sq mi (2.0/km2). The racial makeup of the CDP was 81.25% White, 7.29% Native American, 3.12% from other races, and 8.33% from two or more races. Hispanic or Latino of any race were 11.46% of the population.

There were 32 households, out of which 40.6% had children under the age of 18 living with them, 65.6% were married couples living together, 9.4% had a female householder with no husband present, and 15.6% were non-families. 9.4% of all households were made up of individuals, and 6.3% had someone living alone who was 65 years of age or older. The average household size was 3.00 and the average family size was 3.15.

In the CDP, the population was spread out, with 29.2% under the age of 18, 9.4% from 18 to 24, 28.1% from 25 to 44, 28.1% from 45 to 64, and 5.2% who were 65 years of age or older. The median age was 32 years. For every 100 females, there were 146.2 males. For every 100 females age 18 and over, there were 119.4 males.

The median income for a household in the CDP was $41,500, and the median income for a family was $43,750. Males had a median income of $16,250 versus $38,750 for females. The per capita income for the CDP was $17,652. None of the population and none of the families were below the poverty line.

References

Further reading
Shirk, George H.; Oklahoma Place Names; University of Oklahoma Press; Norman, Oklahoma; 1987: .

Census-designated places in Delaware County, Oklahoma
Census-designated places in Oklahoma